Melville Arthur "Sparky" Vail (July 5, 1906 in Meaford, Ontario - January 29, 1983) was a professional ice hockey player in the National Hockey League for the New York Rangers. He played a total of 50 games over two seasons, 1928–29 and 1929–30, scoring four goals and five points.

Vail scored his first NHL goal on February 10, 1929 versus the Montreal Canadiens at Madison Square Garden.  It was the final goal of the game, which ended in a 3-3 tie.

External links

1906 births
1983 deaths
Canadian ice hockey defencemen
Ice hockey people from Ontario
New York Rangers players
People from Grey County
Pittsburgh Shamrocks players
Canadian expatriate ice hockey players in the United States